Margaret Kudirat Ladipo (born April 16, 1961) is a Nigerian academic and researcher who served as the Rector of Yaba College of Technology from 2009 to 2017.

Early life and education
Margaret is a native of Kwara State but she was born in Kaduna, Kaduna State, Nigeria. She completed her primary and secondary school education from Anglican Girls School, Kaduna and Government Secondary School, Kaduna respectively.

Margaret holds a B.Sc certificate in Chemistry, an M.Sc certificate in Polymer Science and Technology and a Ph.D in Analytical Chemistry from Ahmadu Bello University.

Career
Margaret Ladipo's career first saw her gain employment as a Graduate assistant at Ahmadu Bello University in 1982 before she proceeded to work as Lecturer III at Kaduna Polytechnic in 1984. In 1986, she joined Yaba College of Technology as Lecturer II where she rose through the ranks to become a Chief Lecturer in 2002. Prior to her appointment as Rector, she served as the polytechnic's Consult.

Margaret has authored two books and has published several articles in local and international journals. She is a fellow of the Institute of Operations Research of Nigeria, the Civilian Institute of Democratic Administration and the Institute of Investment Management and Research.

Scandals
Over the course of her administration, Margaret has been accused of "money laundering" and "looting of funds" meant for the development of Yaba College of Technology.

References

1961 births
Living people
People from Kwara State
Yoruba women academics
Ahmadu Bello University alumni
Academic staff of Yaba College of Technology
Academic staff of Kaduna Polytechnic